Danbatta (or Dambatta or Dambarta) is a Local Government Area in Kano State, Nigeria. It is located about 49 miles north of Kano city at the Northern border of Kano state with Jigawa state. It has headquarters at Danbatta town, located on the A2 highway.

It has an approximate area of 732 km and a population of 207,968 at the 2006 census. It is bordered to the north and east by Kazaure and Babura Local Government areas of Jigawa State respectively, and to the south and west by Minjibir and Makoda local Government areas of Kano state respectively.

The town is the location for the Audu Bako College of Agriculture (ABCOA) and Kano State School of Basic Midwifery. It is also home to Zone 3 of the Kano state Hospitals Management Board (HMB), Zonal Office of the Kano state Ministry of Education (MOE), Zonal Medical Store of Kano State Ministry of health (MOH), Zonal Office of Kano State Agricultural and Rural Development Agency (KNARDA) and Zonal Office of the Kano State Water Resources Engineering and Construction Agency (WRECA).

The postal code of the area is 702.

References

Local Government Areas in Kano State